Vukašin "Vule" Trivunović (born 13 March 1983) is a Bosnian professional football manager and former player.

Club career
As a player, Trivunović played for Sarajevo and Borac Banja Luka in the Bosnian Premier League, as well as numerous stints abroad in clubs from Serbia, Germany, Russia, Poland and Kazakhstan. In his playing career, he won two Bosnian Cups. His first with Borac and his second one with Sarajevo.

International career
Trivunović played for the Bosnia and Herzegovina U-21 and made his senior debut for Bosnia and Herzegovina in an August 2006 friendly match against France and has earned a total of 3 caps, scoring no goals. His final international was an October 2006 European Championship qualification match away against Moldova.

Managerial career
After retiring, Trivunović became a professional football manager. So far, he has managed BSK Banja Luka, Sloboda Mrkonjić Grad, Borac, with whom he won the 2016–17 First League of RS, Kozara Gradiška and most recently GOŠK Gabela.

Managerial statistics

Honours

Player
Borac Banja Luka
Bosnian Cup: 2009–10

Sarajevo
Bosnian Cup: 2013–14

Individual
Awards
Bosnian Premier League Player of the Year: 2010

Manager
Borac Banja Luka
First League of RS: 2016–17

References

External links

1983 births
Living people
People from Glamoč
Serbs of Bosnia and Herzegovina
Association football central defenders
Bosnia and Herzegovina footballers
Bosnia and Herzegovina under-21 international footballers
Bosnia and Herzegovina international footballers
FK Borac Banja Luka players
FK Obilić players
SV Wacker Burghausen players
FK Sarajevo players
FC Khimki players
MKS Cracovia (football) players
FC Zhetysu players 
Premier League of Bosnia and Herzegovina players
First League of Serbia and Montenegro players
2. Bundesliga players
Russian Premier League players
Ekstraklasa players
Kazakhstan Premier League players
Bosnia and Herzegovina expatriate footballers
Expatriate footballers in Serbia and Montenegro
Bosnia and Herzegovina expatriate sportspeople in Serbia and Montenegro
Expatriate footballers in Germany
Bosnia and Herzegovina expatriate sportspeople in Germany
Expatriate footballers in Russia
Bosnia and Herzegovina expatriate sportspeople in Russia
Expatriate footballers in Poland
Bosnia and Herzegovina expatriate sportspeople in Poland
Expatriate footballers in Kazakhstan
Bosnia and Herzegovina expatriate sportspeople in Kazakhstan
Bosnia and Herzegovina football managers
FK Sloboda Mrkonjić Grad managers
FK Borac Banja Luka managers
FK Kozara Gradiška managers
NK GOŠK Gabela managers